Roa is the administrative centre of the Lunner municipality, in Viken (county) Norway. Together, with the village Lunner, it forms an urban area with a population of 1,576. The Gjøvik Line goes through Roa, with trains stopping at Roa Station.

References

Villages in Oppland
Villages in Viken (county)